Events in the year 1993 in Gabon.

Incumbents 

 President: Omar Bongo Ondimba
 Prime Minister: Casimir Oyé-Mba

Events 

 5 December – Omar Bongo wins the country's presidential election.

Deaths

References 

 
1990s in Gabon
Years of the 20th century in Gabon
Gabon